Targaryendraconia is an extinct clade of lanceodontian pterosaurs that lived from the Early to Late Cretaceous period in Europe, North America, South America, and Australia.

Classification
Below is a cladogram following a topology by Pêgas and colleagues in 2019. In their analysis, they recovered Targaryendraconia as the sister taxon of the clade Anhangueria, both of which are within the more inclusive group Ornithocheirae. Targaryendraconia is split into two families: the Targaryendraconidae, which contains Aussiedraco, Barbosania, and Targaryendraco, and the Cimoliopteridae, which contains Aetodactylus, Camposipterus, and Cimoliopterus.

References

Pteranodontoids
Hauterivian first appearances